Daniel James Care is a retired American soccer defender who spent one season in Major League Soccer with D.C. United

Early life
In 1993, Care graduated from McIntosh High School where he was part of the 1992 Georgia State High School championship soccer team.  He played his club soccer with the  Fayette Lightning which also won the 1991, 1992 and 1993 Georgia State championship.  He was a 1992 and 1993 NSCAA High School All American soccer player.  Care attended the Clemson University, playing on the men's soccer team from 1993 to 1996.  He was a 1996 Third Team All American.  He graduated with a bachelor's degree in business management.

Career
On February 1, 1997, D.C. United selected Care in the first round (eleventh overall) of the 1997 MLS College Draft. On February 6, 1997, the Richmond Kickers selected Care in the second round of the USISL A-League draft.  Care did not join D.C. for its pre-season training camp in order to complete his degree.  Therefore, he then signed with the Carolina Dynamo on May 1, 1997.  In February 1998, United drafted Care for a second time when they took him in the first round (ninth overall) of the 1998 MLS Supplemental Draft. D.C. sent Care on loan to the Richmond Kickers, Hampton Roads Mariners and Project 40 during the season.  He saw time in only one first team game before being waived on November 2, 1998.  However, he was on the bench for United when they defeated Vasco da Gama in the 1998 Copa Interamericana.  In March 1999, Care signed with the Richmond Kickers but was sent to the Jacksonville Cyclones early in the season.  In May 2000, he signed with the Atlanta Silverbacks.  He spent two seasons with the Silverbacks before being released in February 2002.

References

External links
 

1974 births
Living people
People from Peachtree City, Georgia
Sportspeople from the Atlanta metropolitan area
Soccer players from Georgia (U.S. state)
American soccer players
Association football midfielders
Clemson Tigers men's soccer players
North Carolina Fusion U23 players
D.C. United draft picks
D.C. United players
Richmond Kickers players
Virginia Beach Mariners players
MLS Pro-40 players
Jacksonville Cyclones players
Atlanta Silverbacks players
A-League (1995–2004) players
Major League Soccer players